General Jorge Boonen Rivera (April 16, 1858 – December 6, 1921) was a Chilean military officer and minister.

He was appointed as Army Inspector General (Army Commander-in-chief) on April 19, 1910, a position he held until April 26, 1921.

References

Bibliography

1858 births
1921 deaths
Chilean Ministers of Defense
Chilean Army generals
Chilean people of French descent
People from Valparaíso
Chilean people of Belgian descent